Commandant Anne Christine "Annie" Spencer, CBE (15 December 1938 – 15 July 2012) was the last Director of the Women's Royal Naval Service, serving in that post from 1991 to 1993.

Early life
Spencer was born in Yorkshire in 1938 and educated at Newland School for Girls and the Yorkshire College of Housecraft. Upon graduation in 1959, she was involved in the management of school dinner services in the county. She learned Italian and applied to BOAC to become a stewardess. However, she did not pass the interview stage.

Military career
She was promoted to superintendent (equivalent to captain) on 1 October 1986. She served as Director of NAAFI from 1986 to 1989 and Director of the Women's Royal Naval Service from 1991 to 1993.

She retired from the Royal Navy on 15 December 1993.

Personal life
Spencer never married nor did she have any children. She died in 2012, aged 73.

Honours and decorations
In the 1994 New Year Honours, Spencer was appointed Commander of the Order of the British Empire (CBE). She was appointed Aide-de-Camp to Queen Elizabeth II on 13 March 1991.

References

External links
Obituary - The Telegraph
Obituary - The Times

1938 births
2012 deaths
Women's Royal Naval Service officers
Military personnel from Yorkshire
Commanders of the Order of the British Empire
Navy, Army and Air Force Institutes personnel